The 1869 West Sussex by-election was held on 17 April 1869.  The by-election was held due to the succession to a peerage of the incumbent Conservative MP Henry Wyndham.  It was won by the unopposed Conservative candidate the Earl of March.

References

1869 elections in the United Kingdom
1869 in England
19th century in Sussex
By-elections to the Parliament of the United Kingdom in Sussex constituencies
Unopposed by-elections to the Parliament of the United Kingdom in English constituencies
April 1869 events